Eugene Michael Luks (born circa 1940) is an American mathematician and computer scientist, a professor emeritus of computer and information science at the University of Oregon. He is known for his research on the graph isomorphism problem and on algorithms for computational group theory.

Professional career
Luks did his undergraduate studies at the City College of New York, earning a bachelor's degree in 1960, and went on to graduate studies at the Massachusetts Institute of Technology, earning a doctorate in mathematics in 1966 under the supervision of Kenkichi Iwasawa. He taught at Tufts University from 1966 to 1968, and at Bucknell University from then until 1983, when he joined the University of Oregon faculty as chair of the computer and information science department. He retired in 2006, but was recalled in 2012–2013 to serve as interim chair.

Awards and honors
In 1985, Luks won the Fulkerson Prize for his work showing that graph isomorphism could be tested in polynomial time for graphs with bounded maximum degree. In 2012 he became a fellow of the American Mathematical Society.

Selected publications
.
.
.

References

Year of birth missing (living people)
Living people
American computer scientists
20th-century American mathematicians
Theoretical computer scientists
Graph theorists
Group theorists
City College of New York alumni
Massachusetts Institute of Technology School of Science alumni
Tufts University faculty
Bucknell University faculty
University of Oregon faculty
Fellows of the American Mathematical Society
Place of birth missing (living people)
21st-century American mathematicians